The Emanuel and Christina Anderson House, located in Gresham, Oregon, is a house listed on the National Register of Historic Places.

See also
 National Register of Historic Places listings in Multnomah County, Oregon

References

External links
 

Buildings and structures in Gresham, Oregon
Houses in Multnomah County, Oregon
Houses on the National Register of Historic Places in Oregon
National Register of Historic Places in Gresham, Oregon
Houses completed in 1906
1906 establishments in Oregon